Peacock Heights is a bold array of peaks and ridges, 11 nautical miles (20 km) long and 5 nautical miles (9 km) wide, extending east-southeast from Mount Nares in the Churchill Mountains. The feature rises from about 600 m on Starshot Glacier to about 2600 m near Mount Nares and forms the divide between Flynn Glacier and Donnally Glacier. Named by Advisory Committee on Antarctic Names (US-ACAN) after Dennis S. Peacock (Peacock Peak, q.v.), Director, Solar-Terrestrial Physics Program in the Division of Atmospheric Sciences, National Science Foundation, 1975–87; Section Head for Upper Atmospheric Research, 1988–91; U.S. Antarctic Program Chief Scientist, 1991–2002, concurrently serving as Head, Polar Sciences Section in the National Science Foundation (NSF) Office of Polar Programs.

Mountains of Oates Land